Dean Zachary Look (born July 23, 1937) is an American former football and baseball player. He played college football as quarterback at Michigan State University and professional football for the New York Titans of the American Football League (AFL).  He was also a Major League Baseball (MLB) outfielder, and on-field official in the National Football League (NFL). 

He spent 29 years as an NFL official: first as line judge in 1972-77 and then as side judge from 1978 until he retired after the 2001 season. He was the side judge who signaled touchdown on the historic Joe Montana to Dwight Clark pass better known as "The Catch" during the 1982 NFC Championship game between the Dallas Cowboys and the San Francisco 49ers.  As an official, Look wore the uniform number 49 and was assigned to three Super Bowls—Super Bowl XIII in 1979, Super Bowl XV in 1981, and Super Bowl XXVII in 1993.

Look was an All-American college football quarterback in 1959 playing for the Michigan State Spartans football team.  He was drafted a year later by the Denver Broncos of the AFL, but he played only one game in his career with the New York Titans in 1962.

Look had a brief stint in Major League Baseball, playing three games in 1961 for the Chicago White Sox of the American League. He had six at bats without getting a hit, pinch hitting in two games and getting his lone start in left field on September 30 against the Baltimore Orioles. He went 0 for 4. A brother, Bruce, was a catcher who played eight seasons in professional baseball, including 59 games for the  Minnesota Twins.

Look was inducted into the Michigan Sports Hall of Fame in 2017.

See also
 List of American Football League players
 Chicago White Sox all-time roster

References

External links
 
 

1937 births
Living people
American football quarterbacks
Baseball outfielders
Baseball players from Michigan
Charleston White Sox players
Chicago White Sox players
Lincoln Chiefs players
Lynchburg White Sox players
Michigan State Spartans baseball players
Michigan State Spartans football players
National Football League officials
New York Titans (AFL) players
Players of American football from Michigan
Savannah White Sox players
Sportspeople from Lansing, Michigan